The Southern Railway took a key role in expanding the 660 V DC third rail electrified network begun by the London & South Western Railway. As a result of this, and its smaller operating area, its steam locomotive stock was the smallest of the 'Big Four' companies.

For an explanation of numbering and classification, see British Rail locomotive and multiple unit numbering and classification.

Background

Post-nationalisation
British Railways completed construction of the 'West Country' and 'Merchant Navy' locomotive designs but did not build any further orders. It abandoned the 'Leader' class experiments, and Bulleid left the UK to carry forward his unusual locomotive designs in Ireland.

Withdrawal
Withdrawal of ex-SR locomotives happened mainly towards the end of steam on the Southern Region (in 1967), the pre-Grouping designs having gone before then as electrification spread across the region.

Locomotives of SR design

With the heavy emphasis on electrification for the London suburban area and the Brighton mainline, there was little need for new steam locomotive designs. The main steam tasks were boat trains (Dover, Folkestone and Newhaven), West of England, Kent services and freight. When designing steam locomotives, the designers had some interesting constraints that dictated where the locomotive could be used. Due to the hangover from SE&CR days, most of the lines in Kent were of fairly light construction and would not take the weight of a modern express locomotive until well into the 1930s. Hence the extensive rebuilding (and new construction) of 4-4-0 designs at a time when other lines were busily building Pacifics or heavy 4-6-0s.

The ex-SER lines also had the problem of the narrow Mountfield and Wadhurst tunnels on the Hastings line, requiring locomotive and rolling stock rather narrower than permitted elsewhere. This problem persisted into British Railways days until eventually the tunnels were single tracked, giving clearance for normal stock.

Services for west of Southampton and Salisbury had a different set of problems as neither the Southern Railway nor its constituents installed water troughs, thus leading to large tenders with greater water capacity than those fitted to similar locomotives on other railways.

New designs were:

Richard E. L. Maunsell (1923–1937)

Maunsell also rebuilt, modified or continued the new construction of earlier classes

 LSWR H15 class – Further production
 LSWR N15 class – Further production
 LSWR S15 class – Further production
 LSWR M7 class – One superheated – not repeated
 LSWR T9 class – Superheated
 LSWR 700 class – Superheated
 SECR B1 class
 SECR D class as D1 class
 SECR O class – rebuilt as O1 class
 SECR N class – Further production
 SECR N1 class – Three-cylinder derivative of N class
 LB&SCR C2 class
 LB&SCR L class 4-6-4T –  rebuilt as 4–6–0 SR N15X class
 LB&SCR E1 class 0-6-0T – rebuilt as 0-6-2T SR E1/R class
 LB&SCR I1 class – rebuilt as I1X class

O.V.S. Bulleid (1937–1949)

Bulleid was also responsible for the mechanical part of the three electric locomotives (CC1–CC3, later British Railways Class 70) built at Ashford Works in 1941 (CC1) and 1948 (CC2, CC3). The electrical part was the responsibility of the Southern Railway's Chief Electrical Engineer, Alfred Raworth. Bulleid also designed a 500 hp 0-6-0 diesel mechanical shunter powered by a Davey Paxman power unit. This was built at Ashford Works, though was not introduced until 1950, when it emerged as BR No. 11001.

Locomotives of constituent companies

London and South Western Railway

John Viret Gooch (1841–1851)

Joseph Hamilton Beattie (1850–1871)

William George Beattie (1871–1878)

William Adams (1878–1895)

Dugald Drummond (1895–1912)

Robert W. Urie (1912–1922)

South Eastern Railway

Benjamin Cubitt (1842-1845)

No SER locomotives built – stock administered by the London and Croydon, South Eastern, and London and Brighton Joint Locomotive Committee.

James Cudworth (1845-1876)

White Horse of Kent, 2-2-2, introduced 1845, later rebuilt as a 2-4-0
SER 118 class 0-6-0 introduced 1855
SER 59 class 2-4-0 introduced 1857
SER Singles 2-2-2 introduced 1861
SER 235 class 0-4-4T introduced 1866

John Ramsbottom (1876)

SER Ironclads 2-4-0 introduced 1876

A. M. Watkin (1876)

SER 152 class 'Folkestone Tanks' 0-6-0T introduced 1877

Richard Mansell (1877-1878)

SER 58 class 'Mansell Gunboats' 0-4-4T introduced 1878
SER 59 class 'Mansell Goods' 0-6-0 introduced 1879

James Stirling (1878-1898)

Stirling, like his brother Patrick, built engines
with domeless boilers. Many, however, were rebuilt with domes in later years.

London, Chatham and Dover Railway

Initially, LC&DR engines were given names, they only received numbers after 1874.

On the merger with the South Eastern in 1898, engine numbers were increased by 459, this being the highest number in use on that line.

Joseph Cubitt and Thomas Russell Crampton (1853–1860)

Surplus and secondhand acquisitions (1860–1861)

William Martley (1860–1874)

William Kirtley (1874–1898)

South Eastern and Chatham Railway

Before 1899, both the South Eastern Railway and the London, Chatham and Dover Railway had some Crampton locomotives built by Robert Stephenson and Company.  The SER also had some Cramptons built by Tulk and Ley.

H. S. Wainwright (1899–1913)

 SECR B1 class  4-4-0   introduced 1900  rebuild of SER B Class
 SECR F1 class  4-4-0   introduced 1903  rebuild of SER F Class
 SECR O1 class  0-6-0   introduced 1903  rebuild of SER O Class
 SECR R1 class  0-6-0T  introduced 1910  rebuild of SER R Class

R. E. L. Maunsell (1913–1922)

London, Brighton and South Coast Railway

John Chester Craven (1847-1870)

William Stroudley (1870–1889) 

Many of these engines were later renumbered, frequently into the "duplicate" series above 600.

R. J. Billinton (1890–1904)

D. Earle Marsh (1905–1911) 

 LB&SCR B2X class  4-4-0    introduced 1907  rebuild of B2
 LB&SCR C2X class  0-6-0    introduced 1908  rebuild of C2
 LB&SCR E4X class  0-6-2T   introduced 1909  rebuild of E4
 LB&SCR A1X class  0-6-0T   introduced 1911  rebuild of A1
 LB&SCR E5X class  0-6-2T   introduced 1911  rebuild of E5
 LB&SCR E6X class  0-6-2T   introduced 1911  rebuild of E6

L. B. Billinton (1911–1922) 

 LB&SCR B4X class  4-4-0    introduced 1922  rebuild of B4
 LB&SCR I1X class  4-4-2T   introduced 1923  rebuild of I1

Following the grouping, LB&SCR locomotive numbers were prefixed with "B", but in 1931 the prefix was removed and 2000 added to the number.

Minor companies

Plymouth, Devonport and South Western Junction Railway

Freshwater, Yarmouth and Newport Railway

Isle of Wight Central Railway

Isle of Wight Railway

Diesel and electric locomotives

Diesel shunters
 The Southern Railway built three diesel shunters in 1937, numbered 1–3.  These became British Rail 15201–15203, and were later classified as British Rail Class D3/12.
 Twenty-six similar locomotives were built in 1949–1951 after nationalisation. They were numbered 15211–15236, and were later classified as British Rail Class 12.
 British Rail 11001, Southern Railway design, built 1949 at Ashford Works

Mainline diesels
 The Southern designed a prototype class of mainline diesel-electric locomotive. Three were built, although none were finished before nationalisation. They were numbered 10201–10203, and later classified as British Rail Class D16/2.

Electric shunters
The Waterloo and City Railway (later acquired by the LSWR) had two electric shunting locomotives for its 500 V DC line. The first was of Bo wheel arrangement, built by Siemens Brothers & Co in 1893 later numbered 75S. The second was a Bo-Bo, built at Nine Elms Locomotive Works in 1899 and later numbered 74S.

Mainline electric
The Southern Railway also built two mainline electric locomotives numbered CC1 and CC2. They were renumbered 20001 and 20002 after nationalisation. A third locomotive, 20003, was built in 1948. They were later classified as British Rail Class 70

References

 
British railway-related lists